The Issyk kurgan, in south-eastern Kazakhstan, less than 20 km east from the Talgar alluvial fan, near Issyk, is a burial mound discovered in 1969. It has a height of six meters and a circumference of sixty meters. It is dated to the 4th or 3rd century BC. A notable item is a silver cup bearing an inscription. The finds are on display in Nur-Sultan. It is associated with the Saka peoples.

The burial complex located on the left bank of the Issyk Mountain River, 50 kilometers to the East to the Almaty city. The unique archaeological complex found by a small group of Soviet scientists led by archaeologist Kemal Akishevich Akishev in 1969. The burial ground consists of 45 large Royal mounds with a diameter of 30 to 90 and a height of 4 to 15 meters. The Issyk barrow is located in the Western half of the burial ground. Its diameter is 60 meters and its height is 6 meters.

"Golden man" 
Situated in eastern Scythia just north of Sogdiana, the kurgan contained a skeleton, warrior's equipment, and assorted funerary goods, including 4,000 gold ornaments. Although the sex of the skeleton is uncertain, it may have been an 18-year-old Saka (Scythian) prince or princess.

The richness of the burial items led the skeleton to be dubbed the "golden man" or "golden princess", with the "golden man" subsequently being adopted as one of the symbols of modern Kazakhstan. A likeness crowns the Independence Monument on the central square of Almaty. Its depiction may also be found on the Presidential Standard of Nursultan Nazarbayev.

Symbol of Kazakhstan 
The treasures of the Issyk mound and an exact copy of The Golden man are located in the Kazakh Museum of archaeology in Almaty city and in the State Museum of gold and precious metals of the Republic of Kazakhstan in Astana city. The Golden man on the winged leopard is one of the national symbols of Kazakhstan. Copies of the Saks warrior installed in many cities of Kazakhstan. One of the copies crowns the Independence monument on the Republic square in Almaty city. 
Altogether, in the excavations, found five tombs with the so-called The Golden man: the second The Golden man found in the Barrow Araltobe, the third in Chiliktinsk Kurgan Biglobe, the fourth near Astana city and fifth found in the burial ground Taldy Karkaralinsk district.

Burials
There were two burials in the grave complex: the Central one and the Southern one (to one side). Unfortunately the Central burial site had been robbed but the side grave was undisturbed. The burial chamber in the side grave was constructed from spruce logs. The tomb and its contents remained intact and buried. The skeletal remains were found in the Northern half of the chamber. More than 4,000 gold items were found in the chamber, as well as iron sword and dagger, a bronze mirror, vessels made of clay, metal and wood, shoes, headdresses, gold rings, statuettes, bronze and gold weapons, and an inscribed silver bowl dating from the 6th to 5th century BCE. Many clothing ornaments made of gold, a headdress and shoes were found on and under the remains. Next to the remains were an arrow with a gold tip, a whip (the handle of which was wrapped with a wide ribbon of gold in a spiral pattern) and a bag containing a bronze mirror and red paint. Scientific research, particular that of the anthropologist O. I. Ismagulov, shows that the remains belong to a member of the Saka peoples of Semirecheye, who have a European appearance with an admixture of Mongoloid features. The age of the body at death is estimated at 16–18 years, and its sex is indeterminate. The form of clothing and method of burial suggest that "The Golden Man" was a descendant of a prominent Saks tribe leader, or a member of the Royal family. Some Kazakh historians suggest that the burial belongs to Usun.

The Issyk inscription

A text was found on a silver bowl in Issyk kurgan, dated approximately VI BC. The context of the burial gifts indicates that it may belong to Saka tribes.

The Issyk inscription is not yet certainly deciphered, and is probably in a Scythian dialect, constituting one of very few autochthonous epigraphic traces of that language. János Harmatta, using the Kharoṣṭhī script, identified the language as a Khotanese Saka dialect spoken by the Kushans.

Golden treasures in the kurgan

Notes

References
Hall, Mark E.  Towards an absolute chronology for the Iron Age of Inner Asia.  Antiquity 71 (1997): 863-874.
Harmatta, Janos.  History of Civilization of Central Asia.  Volume 2, Motilal Banarsidass  (1999),  p. 421

External links
Archaeology magazine - Chieftain or Warrior Priestess?
 Иссыкский золотой человек
 К. А. Акишев «Курган Иссык, Искусство саков Казахстана» Москва Искусство 1978
 АКИШЕВ А. К. КОСТЮМ «ЗОЛОТОГО ЧЕЛОВЕКА» И ПРОБЛЕМА КАТАФРАКТАРИЯ
 Исмагилов Р. Б. «Золотой воин» из кургана Иссык: мужчина или женщина? // Наследие веков. Охрана и изучение памятников археологии в Башкортостане. Вып. 1. Уфа, 1995.
 «Алтын-мадам»: Новый взгляд на знаменитое захоронение в Иссыкском кургане

Saka
Scythia
Archaeological sites in Kazakhstan
Kurgans
Iranian archaeological sites